Plantations that operated within the present-day boundaries of West Virginia were located in the counties of the Ridge-and-Valley Appalachians and in the Kanawha and Ohio River valley regions. Beginning in the mid-to-late 18th century, members of the Washington family and other prominent Virginia families began to build elegant Georgian mansions on their plantations in the Ridge-and-Valley Appalachians region of present-day West Virginia. Plantations initially developed in the counties lying within the Northern Neck Proprietary of Thomas Fairfax, 6th Lord Fairfax of Cameron within the Shenandoah Valley and South Branch Potomac River valleys. Slavery as practiced through plantations in the American South was carried over from the plantations of the Piedmont and Tidewater regions of Virginia, where plantations had become the foundation of society and industry. Following the French and Indian War, settlement and agricultural development continued unabated in the Shenandoah and South Branch Potomac valleys. Early instances of western Virginia plantations with grand homes include the John Ariss-designed Harewood (1774) for George Washington's brother Samuel Washington and Happy Retreat (1780) built by Washington's younger brother Charles Washington, both of which are located near Charles Town in present-day Jefferson County. In Hampshire County, Nicholas Casey constructed a Georgian mansion (1774) at his Wappocomo plantation, one of the first plantation houses of its kind in the South Branch Potomac River valley.

Plantations continued to develop along the fringes of present-day West Virginia. By the close of the 18th century, Harman Blennerhassett had constructed a mansion on his plantation on Blennerhassett Island and Moses Shepherd had built Shepherd Hall near Wheeling, both in the Ohio River valley. Despite the agricultural development of then western Virginia's bottomlands and the resulting wealth of the plantation owners, the hinterlands of the Allegheny Mountains and Allegheny Plateau regions remained underpopulated and inhabited by subsistence farmers of meager means into the middle of the 19th century. By the 1860 United States Census, Berkeley, Greenbrier, Hampshire, Hardy, Jefferson, Kanawha, and Monroe counties consequently had the largest populations of slaves in present-day West Virginia.

The economic and political differences between western and eastern Virginia began to grow. Following Virginia's secession from the Union in 1861, the Restored Government of Virginia was established at Wheeling during the American Civil War. Despite West Virginia receiving Union statehood on June 20, 1863, sympathies and loyalties within the state's borders remained divided, especially within areas economically dependent upon the plantation system. However, slaveowners in western Virginia tended to own fewer slaves than their counterparts in eastern Virginia and many did not support Virginia's secession. In Mason County, where small farms were reliant upon slavery, its residents overwhelmingly supported the Union cause. During the war, many plantations in West Virginia served as preferred venues for military headquarters and meeting places for both Union and Confederate military officers due to their adequate accommodations and resources. Altona near Charles Town was utilized as a military headquarters and meeting place for Union generals Philip Sheridan and Ulysses S. Grant, with Sheridan making use of the farm's horses and carriage. Other plantations, like Mill Island and Willow Wall near Moorefield, and Elmwood near Shepherdstown, were utilized as hospitals for wounded soldiers and irregulars.

In anticipation of the passage of the Thirteenth Amendment to the United States Constitution, the West Virginia Legislature at Wheeling passed an act abolishing slavery in West Virginia on February 3, 1865, thus ending the institution of the plantation in West Virginia. Since the 1960s, many of West Virginia's plantation houses have acquired places on the National Register of Historic Places, the United States government's official list of sites, buildings, and structures deemed worthy of preservation. The house at Traveller's Rest, near Kearneysville, is West Virginia's sole plantation house designated as a National Historic Landmark for its national-level historical significance. As of 2015, the majority of West Virginia's plantation houses remain under private ownership.

Key

Plantations

See also 

 History of slavery in West Virginia
 List of plantations in the United States
 National Register of Historic Places listings in West Virginia

References

Bibliography

External links 
 
 West Virginia Division of Culture and History State Historic Preservation Office

Lists of buildings and structures in West Virginia
Lists of National Register of Historic Places in West Virginia
 
West Virginia